Paotai is an unincorporated town located in Shawan County, Xinjiang Uyghur Autonomous Region, China, it is known for the seat of 121st Regiment headquarters of the 8th Division, Xinjiang Production and Construction Corps. The town is 213 km away from Urumqi in the east, 78 km from Shihezi in the southeast, 110 km from Karamay in the northwest, and 120 km from Kuitun in the southwest. The county-level road of Guxin Line and the Keyu Expressway (Karamay - Yushugou) cross the territory, and connected with contact line, its traffic is very convenient.

The territory of the town is also the area of reclaimed land for the 121st Regiment. It has an area of 704.74 square kilometers with a population of 38,320 (as of 2010 census). The name of Paotai was the homophonic Chinese word of "bortai" from the Mongolian language, meaning  land with deers. The town was named for the first time in 1982 census.

Infrastructure
With 6 vertical and 6 horizontal streets, street layout of Paotai is gridded. From east to west, they are Donghuan Road, Xiangyang Road, Guangming Road, Guangming South Road, Guangming West Road and West Ring Road, From south to north, it is Jian'an Road, Renmin Road, Limin Road, Yucai Road, North Ring Road. There are 21 commercial outlets, such as shopping malls, Pharmacy shops, bookstore, bank, cable TV all into the home, and the coverage rate of FM radio stations is 100%. There are Paotai Plaza, East Park, farmers' market, nursing home,  library, a middle school, a primary school, a kindergarten and a hospital.

References 

Xinjiang Production and Construction Corps
Populated places in Xinjiang